Feng Ming-chu (born 22 July 1950) is a Taiwanese historian who served as Director of National Palace Museum from September 2012 to 20 May 2016. She is also the director general of the Chinese Association of Museums and a researcher for the Mongolian and Tibetan Affairs Commission. She is an expert on the history of the Qing dynasty and Tibet.

Early life
Feng was born in Tiu Keng Leng in British Hong Kong in 1950, with her ancestral home in Huangpi, Hubei. In 1974 she was accepted to the National Taiwan University, where she studied history under Li Shouli.

Career
After graduation, she began working in National Palace Museum in 1978. She rose up through the ranks and served as its Deputy Director from May 2008 to September 2012, after which she replaced Chou Kung-shin as Director of the Museum.

Upon retirement from the position of the museum director, Feng announced her plan of accepting the position of an adviser for the Palace Museum in Beijing.

References

1950 births
Living people
National Taiwan University alumni
Hong Kong emigrants to Taiwan
20th-century Taiwanese women writers
Taiwanese women historians
Directors of National Palace Museum
Women museum directors
21st-century Taiwanese historians